Jocelyn Rae and Anna Smith were the two-time defending champions but lost in the quarterfinals to Manon Arcangioli and Magdalena Fręch.

Vera Lapko and Polina Monova won the title, defeating Arcangioli and Fręch in the final, 6–3, 6–4.

Seeds

Draw

References
Main Draw

Engie Open de Seine-et-Marne - Doubles